The Sydney Times was a newspaper published in Sydney, New South Wales, Australia.

History 
The first  four-page issue was published by Nathaniel Lipscomb Kentish on 15 August 1834. It was published on Tuesday and Friday mornings. The paper closed in 1838 due to debt and Kentish resumed his career as a surveyor.

Digitisation
The newspaper has been digitised from 15 August 1834 to 2 July 1838 and is available on Trove.

See also 

 List of newspapers in Australia

References

External links
 

Defunct newspapers published in Sydney